Castellania may refer to:
 Castellania Coppi, a commune in Alessandria, Italy
 Castellania (Valletta), the former law courts in Valletta, Malta
 Terra Alta (comarca) or Castellania, a comarca in Catalonia, Spain
 Inquisitor's Palace or Castellania, a palace in Birgu, Malta

See also
 Castellan, the governor or captain of a castellany and its castle
 Castellana (disambiguation)